William Forster (7 November 1760 – 16 April 1823) was an Anglican priest in Ireland during the early 19th century.

Forster was born in County Meath and educated at Trinity College Dublin. He was the Dean of Kilmacduagh from 1803 until his death.

References

Alumni of Trinity College Dublin
Deans of Kilmacduagh
Church of Ireland priests
19th-century Irish Anglican priests
1823 deaths
1760 births
People from County Meath